Sylvan Springs is a town in Jefferson County, Alabama, United States, located northwest of the Birmingham suburb of Pleasant Grove. It incorporated on May 22, 1957. At the 2010 census the population was 1,542, up from 1,465 in 2000. This area was damaged by an F5 tornado on April 8, 1998, including the First United Methodist Church of Sylvan Springs.

Geography
Sylvan Springs is located at  (33.512650, -87.020636).

Demographics

2000 census
At the 2000 census, there were 1,465 people, 589 households, and 461 families living in the town. The racial makeup of the town was 98.63% White, 0.68% Black or African American, 0.34% Native American, 0.07% Asian, and 0.27% from two or more races. 0.48% of the population were Hispanic or Latino of any race.

Of the 589 households 26.1% had children under the age of 18 living with them, 68.6% were married couples living together, 7.3% had a female householder with no husband present, and 21.7% were non-families. 19.9% of households were one person and 10.7% were one person aged 65 or older. The average household size was 2.49 and the average family size was 2.85.

The age distribution was 18.0% under the age of 18, 8.7% from 18 to 24, 26.6% from 25 to 44, 28.6% from 45 to 64, and 18.2% 65 or older. The median age was 44 years. For every 100 females, there were 93.5 males. For every 100 females age 18 and over, there were 89.1 males.

The median household income was $42,692 and the median family income  was $49,853. Males had a median income of $37,500 versus $23,350 for females. The per capita income for the town was $20,338. About 3.9% of families and 4.7% of the population were below the poverty line, including 5.0% of those under age 18 and 7.8% of those age 65 or over.

2010 census
At the 2010 census, there were 1,542 people, 611 households, and 463 families living in the town. The racial makeup of the town was 97.3% White, 1.4% Black or African American, 0.5% Native American, 0.0% Asian, and 0.7% from two or more races. 0.5% of the population were Hispanic or Latino of any race.

Of the 611 households 22.3% had children under the age of 18 living with them, 62.0% were married couples living together, 10.0% had a female householder with no husband present, and 24.2% were non-families. 21.6% of households were one person and 12.6% were one person aged 65 or older. The average household size was 2.52 and the average family size was 2.92.

The age distribution was 20.4% under the age of 18, 6.0% from 18 to 24, 23.5% from 25 to 44, 30.5% from 45 to 64, and 19.7% 65 or older. The median age was 45.2 years. For every 100 females, there were 87.6 males. For every 100 females age 18 and over, there were 96.6 males.

The median household income was $60,938 and the median family income  was $71,944. Males had a median income of $56,250 versus $37,692 for females. The per capita income for the town was $25,653. About 5.4% of families and 7.5% of the population were below the poverty line, including 12.0% of those under age 18 and 6.0% of those age 65 or over.

2020 census

As of the 2020 United States census, there were 1,653 people, 645 households, and 515 families residing in the town.

References

Towns in Jefferson County, Alabama
Towns in Alabama
Birmingham metropolitan area, Alabama